Mushir-ul-Haq was the Vice Chancellor of the University of Kashmir from 1987 until his murder in Srinagar in 1990.
He was kidnapped, alongside his personal secretary Abdul Gani Zargar, on 6 April 1990; their bodies were found on 10 April 1990. The Jammu Kashmir Students Liberation Front claimed responsibility for his kidnapping and murder. He obtained his PhD from McGill University and later taught at Aligarh Muslim University and Jamia Millia Islamia. Mushir-ul-Haq wrote several books, namely Religion and Politics in Muslim India (1857-1947): A Study, Muslim politics in modern India 1857-1947 (1970), Indian Muslims' Attitude to the British in the Early Nineteenth Century, and Islam in Secular India (1972). He also established the Shah-i-Hamadan Institute of Islamic Studies in 1988.

In April 2009, the Special Court, under the Terrorist and Disruptive Activities (Prevention) Act (TADA) in Jammu, acquitted those charged with Mushir-ul-Haq's murder after a trial which had lasted nineteen years. The presiding officer ruled that one confession was inadmissible and expressed doubts about the voluntary nature of others. In the absence of any corroborating evidence, he dismissed the charges against all of the accused.

In honor of Mushir-ul-Haq, the Shah-i-Hamadan Institute of Islamic Studies at the University of Kashmir organized a memorial lecture on 12 June 2021. Akhtarul Wasey, president of Maulana Azad University, spoke at the lecture.

References

Vice-Chancellors of the University of Kashmir
People murdered in Jammu and Kashmir
1990 deaths
1990 murders in India
Academic staff of Jamia Millia Islamia
McGill University alumni
Academic staff of Aligarh Muslim University
1933 births
Scholars from Jammu and Kashmir
Indian political writers
20th-century Indian historians